Frederick C. Schroeder (January 19, 1910 – November 1, 1980) was a member of the Wisconsin State Assembly.

Schroeder was born in West Bend, Wisconsin. He attended the University of Wisconsin–Madison. He died on November 1, 1980.

Career
Schroeder was first elected to the Assembly in 1964, after defeating nine other candidates for the Republican nomination. He was re-elected in 1966, 1968, 1970, 1972, and 1974.

References

People from West Bend, Wisconsin
Republican Party members of the Wisconsin State Assembly
University of Wisconsin–Madison alumni
1910 births
1980 deaths
20th-century American politicians